Afterimage is a 2016 Polish drama film directed by Andrzej Wajda. It was screened in the Masters section at the 2016 Toronto International Film Festival. It was selected as the Polish entry for the Best Foreign Language Film at the 89th Academy Awards but it was not nominated. It was the Opening film at Indian Film Festival. It is the final film by Wajda who died in October 2016.

Cast
Bogusław Linda – Władysław Strzemiński
Bronislawa Zamachowska – Nika Strzemińska
Zofia Wichłacz – Hania
Andrzej Konopka – personalny
Krzysztof Pieczyński – Julian Przyboś
Szymon Bobrowski – Włodzimierz Sokorski
Mariusz Bonaszewski – Madejski
Anna Majcher – Strzemiński's neighbor
Paulina Gałązka as Wasińska
Aleksander Fabisiak – Rajner
Magdalena Warzecha – museum worker 
Irena Melcer – Jadzia
Tomasz Chodorowski – Tomek
Filip Gurłacz – Konrad
Mateusz Rusin – Stefan
Mateusz Rzeźniczak – Mateusz
Adrian Zaremba – Wojtek
Tomasz Włosok – Roman

Plot
The start of the film begins in 1948 with Strzemiński as an influential lecturer at the School of Visual Arts, Lodz. However he refuses to renounce abstract art despite the new Stalinist regime demanding only Socialist Realist art be taught. This results in him being stripped of his position at the school, and his works (including his famous, “Neo-Plastic Room” at the Muzeum Sztuki in Łódź) were either withdrawn from public view or simply destroyed. Then the bureaucracy denied him his ability to make a living as a sign-painter, prevented him buying art supplies, and collecting food stamps.

See also
List of submissions to the 89th Academy Awards for Best Foreign Language Film
List of Polish submissions for the Academy Award for Best Foreign Language Film

References

External links

2016 films
2016 drama films
2016 biographical drama films
Polish biographical drama films
2010s Polish-language films
Biographical films about painters
Cultural depictions of 20th-century painters
Cultural depictions of Polish men
Films directed by Andrzej Wajda